is a former professional baseball pitcher and pitching coach.

From -, Kobayashi played in the Nippon Professional Baseball league for the Chiba Lotte Marines. From -, he played for Major League Baseball's Cleveland Indians.

He was a member of the Japanese Olympic baseball team for the 2004 Summer Olympics and won a bronze medal.

He led the Pacific League in saves in 2005, and made his 200th save in 2006, becoming the third player in Japanese baseball to reach the mark, after Kazuhiro Sasaki and Shingo Takatsu.

After the 2007 season, he became the only pitcher to record 20 or more saves seven straight years.

On November 2, he declared his Free Agency and expressed his interest in playing for a major league club for the 2008 season.

On November 20, he signed a two-year, $6,250,000 deal with the Cleveland Indians. The deal included a $3.25m club option for a third year.

During the 2008 season, Kobayashi had an average season, going 4–5 with a 4.53 ERA and 6 saves. He started to falter late during the year and thus, his performance declined.

In 2009, Kobayashi had 10 appearances (9.2 innings) with no decisions or saves. His ERA was a booming 8.38 and on May 16 he was designated for assignment. He accepted and was outrighted to Triple-A Columbus. He was released on July 18, 2009.

He signed a one-year contract with the Yomiuri Giants for the 2009 season. After sitting out 2010, he joined the Orix Buffaloes for the 2011 season.

References

External links

 Japanese league stats and info of Masahide Kobayashi

1974 births
Baseball players at the 2004 Summer Olympics
Chiba Lotte Marines players
Cleveland Indians players
Columbus Clippers players
Japanese baseball coaches
Japanese expatriate baseball players in the United States
Living people
Major League Baseball players from Japan
Medalists at the 2004 Summer Olympics
Nippon Professional Baseball coaches
Nippon Professional Baseball pitchers
Olympic baseball players of Japan
Olympic bronze medalists for Japan
Olympic medalists in baseball
Orix Buffaloes players
People from Ōtsuki, Yamanashi
Baseball people from Yamanashi Prefecture
Yomiuri Giants players